Debra Marie Brown (born November 22, 1963) is the Chief United States district judge of the United States District Court for the Northern District of Mississippi.

Biography

Brown was born in 1963, in Yazoo City, Mississippi. She received a Bachelor of Architecture in 1987, from Mississippi State University. Prior to attending law school, she worked as an architect in the Washington, D.C. area. She received a Juris Doctor in 1997 from the University of Mississippi School of Law, where she served as articles editor of the law review. After graduation, she worked at the law firm of Phelps Dunbar LLP for more than fourteen years. From 2012 to 2013, she was a shareholder at the law firm of Wise Carter Child & Caraway, P.A. in Jackson, Mississippi, where she handled a wide variety of commercial litigation matters before both federal and state courts. From 2003 to 2004, she served as President of the Mississippi Women Lawyers Association.

Federal judicial service

On May 16, 2013, President Barack Obama nominated Brown to serve as a United States District Judge of the United States District Court for the Northern District of Mississippi, to the seat vacated by Judge W. Allen Pepper, Jr., who died on January 24, 2012. The Senate Judiciary Committee reported her nomination to the full Senate on August 1, 2013 by voice vote. Brown was confirmed as a district judge on November 4, 2013 by a vote of 90–0. She received her judicial commission on November 5, 2013, and was sworn in by Judge Michael P. Mills on December 18, 2013, becoming the first African-American to become a District Judge in Mississippi. Brown became the Chief Judge on June 11, 2021, succeeding Judge Sharion Aycock, becoming the first African-American woman to serve as Chief Judge for the Northern District of Mississippi.

See also 
 List of African-American federal judges
 List of African-American jurists
 List of first women lawyers and judges in Mississippi

References

External links

1963 births
Living people
21st-century American judges
21st-century American women judges
African-American judges
American women architects
American women lawyers
American lawyers
Judges of the United States District Court for the Northern District of Mississippi
Mississippi lawyers
Mississippi State University alumni
People from Yazoo City, Mississippi
University of Mississippi School of Law alumni
United States district court judges appointed by Barack Obama